"Sierra" is a song co-written and recorded by American country music duo Maddie & Tae. It was released to radio on May 16, 2016 as the fourth and final single off of their debut studio album, Start Here. The song was written by the duo (Taylor Dye/Madison Marlow) and Aaron Scherz.

Content
The song describes and pokes fun at a bully girl named Sierra. The song takes inspiration a real life experience happened to Marlow: "I went home crying at least once a week because she was just so mean".

Critical reception
Taste of Country reviewed the song favorably, saying that the girls "stay true to the instantly contagious hooks and riffs that make Start Here such an enjoyable listen out of the box".

Chart performance
"Sierra" peaked at No. 47 on the Country Airplay chart, being their first single to not hit the top 40 and making it their lowest peaking single until "Woman You Got" in 2021.

References

2016 singles
Maddie & Tae songs
Dot Records singles
Song recordings produced by Dann Huff
2016 songs